The Great Gypsy Round-up, also known as the general imprisonment of the Gypsies (prisión general de gitanos), was a raid authorized and organized by the Spanish Monarchy that led to the arrest of most Roma in the region and the genocide of 12,000 Romani people. Although a majority were released after a few months, many others spent several years imprisoned and subject to forced labor. The raid was approved by the King Ferdinand VI of Spain, and organized by the Marquis of Ensenada, and set in motion simultaneously across Spain on July 30, 1749.

Since a royal edict by Charles II in 1695, Spanish Romani had been restricted to certain towns. An official edict in 1717 restricted them to only 75 towns and districts, so that they would not be concentrated in any one region.

As Nicolás Jiménez González argues, "It should be highlighted that the 1749 Great Round-Up is the oldest-known attempted genocide against the Roma people carried out in the Spanish territories. To understand this better, a note of clarification is necessary. The term “genocide” did not yet exist in the language of the time; in official documents, the term “extermination” was used. However, the authorities did not intend to immediately “exterminate” the Roma population in prisons. Instead, they wanted the destruction of Roma people to be the consequence of imprisoning men and women separately, making it impossible for a new generation of Roma to be conceived. Therefore, from today’s perspective, the General Imprisonment complies with the contemporary definition of the term 'genocide'.

Organization 

The plans for the roundup were developed in secrecy. Among the first to draw up plans was the appointed Governor of the Council of Castile, Gaspar Vázquez Tablada, Bishop of Oviedo. It was later also supported by the opinion of the Jesuit Father Francisco Rávago, confessor to Ferdinand VI, whose reply about the morality of the roundup can be summarised in his commentary that: 

The plan entailed sending troops to the towns with Romani settlements, each carrying sealed set of instructions, which were only to be revealed to the commanders on a date just prior to the roundup in August. The Romani settlements were to be surrounded, and all able-bodied adult Romani males were internally deported to forced labor in the Naval arsenals or to specified mines, prisons, or factories. The women and children were forced into clothing manufacture. Those too ill to travel would remain in military custody until well enough to travel, or until they reached a "Christian death". The operation was to be funded by confiscated goods and homes of the Romani.

The mechanics of the raid varied in efficiency from town to town. The roundup in Seville, where the city gates were closed by the encircling army to prevent the target's escape, created alarm in the general public, who was ignorant of the goals. Special proclamations were obtained to avoid the use of churches as an asylum. The definition of who exactly was a Romani proved to be difficult in many cases and was prone to abuse. For example, Roma married to non-romani were often spared. Nomadic Romani, already less frequent, proved difficult to the roundup. Ultimately, nearly 9,000 Romani were detained, 5,000 of which were released three months later due to pleas, protests from neighbors and local authorities. The remaining 4,000 who did not benefit from community support would be released gradually from 1750 onwards over an eight year plight during which it is estimated around 500 perished due to various causes.

Reversal

The immediate outrage and protests caused by the imprisonment of those Romani who were well integrated in their community led to the release of a majority of those imprisoned three months following the round-up. The remaining 4000 were released gradually from 1750 onwards. By 1763, the hundred remaining prisoners were pardoned and released by Royal decree.

Sources
Antonio Gómez Alfaro, La Gran Redada de Gitanos, Ed. presencia gitana, Madrid, 1993. 
Teresa San Román. La diferencia inquietante, (esp. págs. 38 a 43) Ed. Siglo XXI. Madrid, 1997. 
Angus Fraser, Los gitanos, (esp. pág. 170 y sig.), Ed. Ariel, Barcelona, 2005, .
Becky Taylor, Another Darkness Another Dawn London UK. 2014.

Notes

Antiziganism in Spain
Romani history
18th century in Spain
1749 establishments in Spain
1749 in Spain
Romani-related controversies
Persecution
Romani in Spain
Ethnic cleansing in Europe
Genocides in Europe